Sean Taylor (1983–2007) was an American football free safety.

Sean Taylor or Shaun Taylor may also refer to:

 Sean Taylor (musician) (born 1968), Australian guitarist
 Sean Taylor (author), British children's book author
 Sean Taylor (footballer) (born 1985), English footballer
 Sean Taylor (writer) (born 1968), comic book, graphic novel and prose writer
 Sean Taylor (singer-songwriter) (born 1983), singer-songwriter from Kilburn, North-West London

See also
 Shaun Taylor (born 1963), British footballer
 Shaun Taylor-Corbett (born 1978), American actor
 List of people with surname Taylor